"Maneater" is a song by the American duo Hall & Oates, featured on their eleventh studio album, H2O (1982). It reached number one on the Billboard Hot 100 chart on December 18, 1982. It remained in the top spot for four weeks, more than any of the duo's five other number-one hits, including "Kiss on My List", which remained in the top spot for three weeks.

Background and writing
In an interview with American Songwriter in 2009,  Daryl Hall recalled,
John had written a prototype of "Maneater"; he was banging it around with Edgar Winter. It was like a reggae song. I said, "Well, the chords are interesting, but I think we should change the groove." I changed it to that Motown kind of groove. So we did that, and I played it for Sara Allen and sang it for her…[Sings] "Oh here she comes / Watch out boy she’ll chew you up / Oh here she comes / She's a maneater… and a…" I forget what the last line was. She said, "drop that shit at the end and go, 'She's a maneater,' and stop! And I said, 'No, you’re crazy, that's messed up.'" Then I thought about it, and I realized she was right. And it made all the difference in the song.

Hall also opined,
"We try and take chances. Our new single "Maneater" isn't something that sounds like anything else on the radio. The idea is to make things better."

John Oates has explained that while it is natural to assume the lyrics are about a woman, the song actually was originally written "about NYC in the ’80s. It's about greed, avarice, and spoiled riches. But we have it in the setting of a girl because it's more relatable. It's something that people can understand. That's what we do all of the time", after describing how they took a similar approach with the earlier song "I Can't Go for That (No Can Do)".

Billboard called it a "moody midtempo piece which has the percolating bass line of a mid-60's Supremes record and the atmospheric sweep of a Giorgio Moroder film score."  Cash Box said that the opening bassline resembles that of the Supremes' song "You Can't Hurry Love."

Music video
The Hall & Oates music video opens with a woman (Aleksandra Duncan) walking down a red staircase, and the band playing in a dimly lit studio with shafts of light projecting down on them. The band members step in and out of the light for their lip sync. A young woman in a short party dress is shown in fade-in and fade-out shots, along with a black jaguar, hence the song line "The woman is wild, a she-cat tamed by the purr of a Jaguar." (In the lyrics' context, the Jaguar in question is the car manufacturer.) The song's chorus is "oh, oh here she comes; watch out boy, she'll chew you up; oh, oh here she comes, she's a maneater."

Personnel
Daryl Hall – lead vocals and backing vocals, keyboards, synthesizers
John Oates – lead guitar, backing vocals, Linn LM-1 programming
G. E. Smith – rhythm guitar, backing vocals
Tom Wolk – bass 
Mickey Curry – drums
Charles DeChant - saxophone

Legal action
In November 2008, Hall & Oates initiated legal action against their music publisher Warner/Chappell Music. An unidentified singer-songwriter was alleged to have used "Maneater" in a 2006 recording, infringing copyright, and by failing to sue for copyright infringement, Warner Chappell Music was alleged to have breached their contract with Hall and Oates.

Charts and certifications

Weekly charts

Year-end charts

All-time charts

Certifications

See also
List of Billboard Hot 100 number-singles of 1982
List of Billboard Hot 100 number-singles of 1983

References

External links
VH1 VSPOT "Maneater"

1981 songs
1982 singles
Billboard Hot 100 number-one singles
Cashbox number-one singles
Hall & Oates songs
RCA Records singles
Songs written by Daryl Hall
Songs written by John Oates
Songs written by Sara Allen
Songs about New York City